Marquette Hotel, also known as the Springfield Business College and Hotel State, is a historic hotel building located in Springfield, Missouri, United States. Built about 1906, it is a three-story, brick commercial building. It has a recessed entrance. It originally housed a business college, then converted to a hotel in 1918. It continued as a hotel until the mid-1980s.

It was added to the National Register of Historic Places in 2000.

References

Hotel buildings on the National Register of Historic Places in Missouri
Hotel buildings completed in 1918
Buildings and structures in Springfield, Missouri
National Register of Historic Places in Greene County, Missouri